Philonomon is a genus of dragonfly in family Libellulidae. It contains the following species:
 Philonomon luminans

Libellulidae
Taxonomy articles created by Polbot